Daon is a commune in the Mayenne department in north-western France.

Sights
 Saint-Germain Church, under renovation in 2012.
 The Logis de la Grande Jaillerie.
 Le Logis du Petit Marigné, listed as a historical monument since 1997.

Castles
Daon is the commune of the Pays de Château-Gontier containing the most of castles, with around ten of these on its territory:

 The Castle of l'Escoublère, 16th century, listed as a historical monument since 1927.
 Mortreux Castle, listed as a historical monument since 1933.
 The Castle Places.
 Lutz Castle.
 Castle of the Porte.
 Bréon Castle.
 Nouairie Castle.
 Touche-Belin Castle.
 Bellevue Castle, known as Villa Bellevue.
 Beaumont Castle.

See also
Communes of the Mayenne department

References

Communes of Mayenne